Saori Sakoda (迫田さおり Sakoda Saori, born December 18, 1987) was a Japanese volleyball player who played for Toray Arrows. She also played for the All-Japan women's volleyball team.

Clubs 
  Kagoshima-nishi High School
  Toray Arrows (2006-17)

Individual 
 2008 Asian Club Championship "Best Scorer"
 2010 V.League (Japan): Best 6, Best Server
 2010 Kurowashiki Tournament Best6
 2013 FIVB Women's World Grand Champions Cup - Best Outside Hitter
 2013-14 V.Premier League - Best6, Best Scorer

Team 
2007 Domestic Sports Festival (Volleyball) -  Champion, with Toray Arrows
2007-2008 Empress's Cup -   Champion, with Toray Arrows
2007-2008 V.Premier League -  Champion, with Toray Arrows
2008 Domestic Sports Festival -  Runner-Up, with Toray Arrows
 2008 Asian Club Championship -  Bronze Medal with Toray Arrows
2008-2009 V.Premier League -  Champion, with Toray Arrows
2009 Kurowashiki All Japan Volleyball Championship -  Champion, with Toray Arrows
2009-2010 V.Premier League -  Champion, with Toray Arrows
2010 Kurowashiki All Japan Volleyball Championship -  Champion, with Toray Arrows
2010-2011 Empress's Cup -   Runner-Up, with Toray Arrows
2010-2011 V.Premier League -  Runner-up, with Toray Arrows
2011-2012 Empress's Cup -   Champion, with Toray Arrows
2011-2012 V.Premier League -  Champion, with Toray Arrows

National Team 
2010 World Championship -  Bronze medal
2011 Montreux Volley Masters -  Champion
2011 Asian Championship -  Silver medal
2012 Olympics -  Bronze medal
2013 World Grand Champion Cup -  Bronze medal
2016 Olympics - 5th place (tied)

References

External links
 Toray Arrows Women's Volleyball Team
 FIVB Biography
 London2012.com - profile

1987 births
Living people
People from Kagoshima
Volleyball players at the 2012 Summer Olympics
Volleyball players at the 2016 Summer Olympics
Olympic bronze medalists for Japan
Olympic medalists in volleyball
Japanese women's volleyball players
Olympic volleyball players of Japan
Medalists at the 2012 Summer Olympics
Japan women's international volleyball players